The Chinese People's Armed Police Force (abbreviation: PAP) is a Chinese paramilitary organization primarily responsible for internal security, riot control, counter-terrorism, disaster response, law enforcement and maritime rights protection as well as providing support to the People's Liberation Army (PLA) during wartime.

Unlike the civilian People's Police, the PAP is a specialized paramilitary force reporting directly to the Central Military Commission (CMC). PAP officers and soldiers wear dark olive green uniforms, different from pine green uniforms of the People's Liberation Army (PLA) or the light blue and black uniforms of the People's Police.

The PAP is estimated to have a total strength of 1.5 million. It was established in its current form in 1982, but similar security forces have operated since the founding of the People's Republic of China in 1949. During the Maoist era, the PAP's predecessors were the Chinese People's Public Security Force, initially under the MPS, and later the Public Security Corps which was under the command of the PLA. The PAP has been compared by both Chinese and foreign scholars with the gendarmerie forces found in many countries, most famously the French Gendarmerie, but the main inspiration for the PAP's establishment and operation came from the Internal Troops of the Soviet Union and related paramilitary forces of the Eastern Bloc such as the East German Alert Units, adapted to the specific military-political culture and thinking of the Chinese Communist Party (CCP) leadership.

History 
The history of the People's Armed Police is as long as that of the People's Republic, and its origin can be traced back to the People's Liberation Army, which was responsible for both defending the nation from foreign invasions and maintaining internal security. Although the force was officially established in 1982, its constituent units stretch back to 1949.

Chinese People's Public Security Force 
In July 1949, the CMC decided to establish the Ministry of Public Security (MPS) with Luo Ruiqing as its minister to organize the public security forces in the nation. In August 1949, several security and public order units of the Fourth Field Army were consolidated into the Central Column of the Chinese People's Public Security Force (PSF) to guard the Party and State leaders and to keep the public order in the capital. The Central Column provided security for the inauguration ceremony of the People's Republic.  From December 1949 to May 1950, regional security forces, along with the now dissolved Central Column, had been consolidated into divisions under the PSF.

The PSF was assigned to the PLA and became the PLA Public Security Force in September 1950, and the PLA Public Security Corps in July 1955, reporting under the Central Military Commission of the CCP and the National Defense Council of the People's Republic. Luo Ruiqing was appointed as the commander and political commissar of the PSF in September 1950 and remained on the posts until 1959, retaining the command of the PSF.

As of 1960, the Public Security Corps was organised in 8,200-strong Public Security Divisions, which were deemed not capable of independent, sustained, full-scale combat operations.

People's Armed Police 
After numerous reorganizations and control transfers between the PLA and the MPS, the People's Armed Police was created on 19 June 1982, combining the previous armed police, border guards and fire brigades. The headquarter was set up in the MPS as a subordinate department. The establishment of the PAP highlighted the efforts to increase the professionalization of the security apparatus, as well as the absorption of numerous PLA demobilized personnel, in the wake of growing unrest.

The PAP was led by both the local government and superior PAP forces, which is called "Dual-Leadership" (双重领导). In practice, the local government (including the local party committee, local people's government and the local public security bureau) carries more weight. However, there were many confusions and loopholes caused by this ambiguous organization structure.

In the mid and late 1990s, CCP general secretary Jiang Zemin significantly expanded and strengthened the PAP, with more than 100,000 new troops. Jiang praised the PAP, describing it as "a major force for maintaining state security and social stability, the People's Armed Police shoulders a massive and formidable burden" and deployed it extensively in Xinjiang and Tibet.

Up until 2013, the China Coast Guard was a part of the PAP. In 2013, it was separated and transferred to the direct control of the Ministry of Public Security and the State Oceanic Administration. However, in March 2018, it was announced that the Coast Guard would be placed under the People's Armed Police Force once again since the State Oceanic Administration was disbanded, but now as an independent branch reporting directly to PAP headquarters.

2017-2018 Reform 

Until 31 December 2017, the People's Armed Police had a dual command structure including the Central Military Commission (CMC) and the State Council through the Ministry of Public Security (MPS).

Prior to the 2018 reform, the People's Armed Police was further divided into eight corps: Internal Guard, Gold, Forestry, Hydropower, Transportation, Border Defense, Firefighting, and Safeguard Corps. The Internal Guard Corps, which makes up for the bulk of PAP, is under the PAP Headquarters and reports thus to the party central committee and the CMC (Central Military Commission). The Gold, Forestry, Hydropower, and Transportation Corps, collectively known as the Specialist Corps, were by then under the joint leadership of PAP Headquarters and their respective ministries in the State Council. The Border Defense, Firefighting, and Guard Corps, collectively known as the Public Security Corps, were then under the direct supervision of the Ministry of Public Security (MPS).

By law however, the PAP operates separately from the PLA. and, in terms of conducting public security operations and relevant capability building, the PAP Headquarters is under the leadership and command of the Ministry of Public Security (MPS).

From 1 January 2018, command of the People's Armed Police is jointly held by the CCP central committee and the Central Military Commission (CMC), with the PAP no longer subordinate to the State Council.

The reform was reportedly carried out in order to deprive the local Chinese Communist Party authorities of the power to use the PAP units to commit abuses or against the leadership in Beijing, especially after the Wang Lijun incident in which the PAP was allegedly abused by provincial party secretary Bo Xilai to surround the US Consulate in Chongqing after a falling out with Wang, the police chief of Chongqing at the time. Under the 2018 reforms, local authorities now need central approval in order to deploy the PAP.

On 21 March 2018, the Central Committee of the Chinese Communist Party unveiled a reform plan for the People's Armed Police Force. Under this plan, the non-combatant elements of the PAP, the Gold, Forestry, Hydropower, Border Defense, Firefighting, and Guard Corps, are to be removed and the CCG is to be consolidated with PAP. As of March 2018, the PAP is working with the Central Committee and the relevant organs for the transfer of non-combatant elements into civil service. The Transportation Corps is the only remaining component of the Specialist Corps.

Until 2018, the Specialist Corps were responsible in constructing and maintaining highways and roads, surveying mineral deposits, fighting forest fires, and constructing large scale  waterworks like dams and levees as well as for water works maintenance. The PAP is also called upon in emergency rescue and disaster relief operations within the PRC via the specialist and public security forces which can be forward deployed during such operations.

Organizational changes 
With the 2018 reforms, Specialist Corps other than the Transportation Corps have been placed under other ministries. China Coast Guard (CCG) was transferred from State Council to PAP command, and the Transportation Corps has some units under the Mobile Contingents.

The Border Defense Corps and Guards Corps have been absorbed by the Ministry of Public Security (MPS). The Firefighting and Forestry Corps  were merged with the fire department of the MPS and reorganized as China Fire and Rescue (CF&R), it was placed under the Ministry of Emergency Management. The Gold Corps and Hydropower Corps have been transformed into state-owned  enterprises under the supervision of the relevant State Council ministries (Ministry of Natural Resources and China National Gold Group Corporation and China Aneng Construction Corporation, respectively).

Chronology 
From  the establishment of the People's Republic of China in 1949, the paramilitary public security force has been reorganized numerous times. The current designation since 1982, the People's Armed Police, was first used between 1959 and 1963.

1949–1950: Chinese People's Public Security Force, under the Ministry of Public Security (MPS)
1950–1955: Public Security Force, under the People's Liberation Army (PLA)
1955–1959: Public Security Corps, under the PLA
1959–1963: People's Armed Police, under the joint leadership of the MPS and the PLA
1963–1966: Chinese People's Public Security Force, under the joint leadership of the MPS and the PLA
1966–1982: PLA Internal Guard, absorbed into the PLA in an integrated structure. In 1971 and 1973, some units were transferred to the MPS
1982–present: People's Armed Police (PAP)

Mission and operations 

The People's Armed Police is formally regulated by the People's Armed Police Law of the People's Republic of China, adopted and effective since 27 August 2009.

The People's Armed Police's primary mission is internal security. The first law on the People's Armed Police, the Law on the People's Armed Police Force (PAPF), was passed in August 2009, giving it statutory authority to respond to riots, terrorist attacks or other emergencies. Such units guard government buildings at all levels (including party and state organisations, foreign embassies and consulates), provide security to public corporations and major public events, as well as counter-terrorism and handling of public emergencies. Some units perform guard duty in civilian prisons and provide executioners for the state. The PAP also maintains tactical counter-terrorism (CT) units in the Immediate Action Unit (IAU), Snow Wolf Commando Unit (SWCU) and various Special Police Units (SPUs).

In the Chinese policing system, the People's Armed Police concentrates on managing protests otherwise referred to as "mass incidents" and protecting important facilities and events, while the public security officers focus on handling crime and issues related to the maintenance of public order. The People's Armed Police assists the regular police in operations where violent opposition is expected, in roadblocks and  the protection of crime scenes. The People's Armed Police is also involved in anti-crime campaigns. In order maintenance activities, the People's Armed Police uses the preventive patrol, under the leadership of the public security organs, and sometimes in conjunction with them. When dealing with mas incidents, with gang activities and other risk situations, responsibility shifts to the People's Armed Police. However, the People's Armed Police also conducts exclusive patrols.

The PAP maintains both a division-sized mechanized infantry unit and a rapid deployment light motorized infantry unit, these units are tasked with responding to any possible armed mutinies by PLA soldiers. In wartime deployments the PAP can act as light infantry supporting the PLAGF in local defense missions and in support of the PLAN in naval operations.

International operations 
While the People's Armed Police is principally charged with internal security and guarding key facilities and installations, it also operates as part of the international security efforts of the People's Republic of China, against both terrorism and organized crime. Mathieu Duchâtel for The National Bureau of Asian Research identifies the legal basis of the PAP missions abroad in Article 71 of the 2015 Counter-terrorism Law. According Armed Police Force University professor Zhou Jian, counterterrorism is a task provided by law for the People's Armed Police and operating missions abroad is an “irreplaceable means”.

The People's Armed Police sent personnel abroad to receive training or provide training and participates in counter-terrorism exercises, especially across Central Asia in bilateral and multilateral agreements.   PAP special operations forces are also deployed in the Chinese embassies of Baghdad and Kabul for the purposes of protection of diplomatic staff and property.

Starting in 2014, the People's Republic of China established a security cooperation with Tajikistan and Afghanistan on Afghan border, near the Wakhan Corridor and in Gorno-Badakhshan Autonomous Region. The People's Armed Police is the main force for both bilateral and trilateral counterterrorism operations (mainly reconnaissance patrols in remote  areas), being deployed south of Shaymak; the PAP  has also conducted training for Tajik security forces.

Since 2011, the People's Armed Police has also conducted operations along the Mekong river with the security forces of Thailand, Myanmar and Cambodia. These operations are aimed against organized crime.

Headquarters and organisation 
The People's Armed Police Headquarters is the leading and commanding organ that directs and administers all the units and provides guidance to it. The PAP has a commander, a political commissar and several deputy commanders and deputy political commissars. The PAP also has departments responsible for logistical and political matters and several speciality departments.

Following adjustment and reorganisation, the People's Armed Police is mainly composed of the territorial forces, the mobile forces, and the Coast Guard.

The People's Armed Police Headquarters, placed at Theater Command Grade, include five Departments directly under the Headquarters:
 Staff Department (Deputy Theater Command Grade);
 Training Bureau (Division Leader Grade);
 Intelligence Bureau (Division Leader Grade), led by Zhang Xiaoqi;
 Political Work Department (Deputy Theater Command Grade): led by Director Lieutenant general Gao Wei;
 Propaganda Bureau (Division Leader Grade);
 Soldier and Civilian Personnel Bureau (Division Leader Grade);
 Discipline Inspection Commission (Deputy Theater Command Grade);
 Logistics Department (Corps Leader Grade);
 Equipment Department (Corps Leader Grade).
Being of Theatre Command Grade, the People's Armed Police is led by a full General.

Training 
The People's Armed Police has a number of training institutions, likely overseen by the Training Bureau of the Staff Department.

 People's Armed Police Academy (Corps Leader Grade, led by a Major General)
 People's Armed Police Engineering University (Corps Leader Grade, led by a Major General)
 People's Armed Police Command Academy (Corps Leader Grade, led by a Major General)
 People's Armed Police Logistics Academy (Corps Leader Grade, led by a Major General)
 People's Armed Police Officers Academy (Deputy Corps Leader Grade, led by a Major General)
 People's Armed Police Special Police Academy (Deputy Corps Leader Grade, led by a Major General)

New constables of the People's Armed Police are drawn from the general military conscription pool, but they are trained in the People's Armed Police basic training units.

According to Zi Yang, the state of the education and training system as of 2016 suffered of issues which negatively affected the quality of education.

People's Armed Police Academy 
The People's Armed Police Academy tasked with officer education and training for duties related to the missions entrusted to the People's Armed Police, including, since 2001, UN peacekeeping. The People's Armed Police Academy is headquartered in Langfang, of Hebei. The People's Armed Police Academy started to recruit cadets in 1984; since 1997, it has begun to issue bachelor's degrees; in 2003 it was allowed to issue master's degrees. According to a 2019 source, it is subordinate to the Ministry of Public Security. The PAP Academy is a Corps Leader Grade command, and thus it is led by a major general who serves as Superintendent. All graduates to the academy are commissioned into the PAP as Second Lieutenants (equivalent of Ensigns for those commissioned into the Coast Guard).

People's Armed Police Logistics Academy 
The People's Armed Police Logistics Academy is a training body aimed to train People's Armed Police personnel in handling logistics. According to Unit Tracker, the university include subjects as applied economics, military and paramilitary logistics, as well as engineering. The Logistics Academy is a Corps Leader Grade command, and thus it is led by a major general.

Mobile organization 
The mobile organization emerging from 2018 reforms consists of two large formations tasked with providing support to the whole national territory, should the need arise;

These two Mobile Contingents have a similar structure and are considered corps leader grade, one level higher than all of the provincial contingents other than Xinjiang and Beijing Commands. Units of the Mobile Contingents mostly originate from former 14 PAP's Divisions. Each Mobile Contingent maintains a Staff, a Political Work Department and a Discipline Inspection Department at the Deputy Corps Leader Grade.

The mobile Contingents, like their predecessor 14 Divisions, are mainly responsible for dealing with terrorism, violent crime, riots, and public security threats.

Being of Corps leader grade, Mobile Contingents are led by a Major General each.

1st Mobile Contingent 
The 1st Mobile Contingent is based in Shijiazhuang, Hebei, south of Beijing. The Contingent covers northern and central China, including Beijing. The 1st Mobile Contingent consists of:
 9 mobile detachments (Panjin, Liaoning; Shenyang, Liaoning; Bayisingtu, Inner Mongolia; Tianjin; Dingzhou, Hebei; Baoding, Hebei; Puzhong, Shanxi; Zhengzhou, Henan; Pingliang, Gansu);
 3 Special Operations detachments (Beijing; Tianjin; Shijiazhuang);
 2 Transportation detachments (Beijing and Xi’an, Shaanxi);
 1 Engineering/Chemical Defence detachment (Huludao, Liaoning);
 1 Helicopter detachment (Puzhong, Shanxi).

2nd Mobile Contingent 
The 2nd Mobile Contingent is headquartered in Fuzhou, with units concentrated in Fujian and surrounding provinces along the coast (covering eastern and southern China). The 2nd Mobile Contingent consists of:
 9 mobile detachments (Wuyi, Jiangsu; Putian, Fujian; Guangzhou; Foshan, Guangdong; Mengzi, Yunnan; Nanchong, Sichuan);
 2 Special Operations detachments (Guangzhou and Huzhou, Zhejiang);
 3 Transportation detachments (Hefei, Anhui; Mianyang, Sichuan; Linzhi, Tibet);
 1 Engineering/Chemical Defense detachment (Fuzhou, Fujian);
 1 Helicopter detachment (Chengdu, Sichuan).
The incumbent Commander is Major General Chen Hongwu, while the Political Commissar is Major General Yang Zhenguo.

Internal Guard Corps 
The People's Armed Police is not subordinated to the local government authorities. Instead, the People's Armed Police is composed of echelons corresponding to all government levels, from the Provincial (including Autonomous Regions or Municipalities directly under the central government) to the Township levels; the territorial organisation is that of the PAP Internal Guard Corps.

The thirty-one Internal Guard Contingents are responsible for security duty of important political and economic facilities and government buildings at all levels (including party and state organizations, foreign embassies, and consulates), municipal armed patrol, and security duty for senior government officials.

Provincial level 
Within each provincial level division, an IGC Contingent, a formation equivalent in rank to a PLA Division, is stationed, with the exception of Macau and Hong Kong. The provincial command is deputy corps leader grade, with the exception of Xinjiang and Beijing Commands, which are senior in rank. A provincial Contingent is deemed to be between 15,000 and 30,000 troops strong.

The main tasks of the provincial commands are to undertake fixed target duty and urban armed patrol missions, to ensure the security of important national goals, as force multipliers during emergency situations, whether be natural or man made, to maintain national security and social stability, to support national economic construction and to carry out rescue and disaster relief missions in tandem with other organizations.

Each Contingent maintains a Staff, a Political Work Department and a Discipline Inspection Department. Beijing and Xinjiang Contingents maintain these departments at the Deputy Corps Leader Grade, while the other 30 Contingents maintain them at the Division Leader Grade. All provincial-level Contingents maintain "Duty Detachments", which perform routine duties, including protecting government compounds, in order to be able to complement the Public Security apparatus in case of the latter's failure to handle riots and other forms of mass incidents.

Alongside the territorial forces, units roughly equivalent to PLA ground force regiments/brigades, some of which formerly subordinated to the disbanded 14 mobile divisions and some already established within the provincial commands, have been renamed "Mobile Detachments". Several of these Mobile Detachments are assigned to the provincial-level commands, in order to provide local authorities of rapid reaction forces. 26 provincial-level subdivisions have 1 Mobile Detachment in addition to the provincial force; seven subdivisions instead have more than one:
 Xinjiang: 7 Mobile Detachments;
 Beijing: 4 Mobile Detachments;
 Sichuan: 4 Mobile Detachments;
 Yunnan: 3 Mobile Detachments;
 Tibet: 3 Mobile Detachments;
 Qinghai: 2 Mobile Detachments;
 Shanghai: 2 Mobile Detachments.

Lower levels 
The IGC Contingents deployed at the provincial levels are further downsized to regiments/brigades, battalions and companies in battle order, which are stationed in a number of provinces, autonomous regions and municipalities directly under the headquarters. All the contingents have elementary command colleges under them.

A PAP Detachment (equivalent to a PLA regiment/brigade) is stationed at the prefectural level, a public security battalion (equivalent to a PLA battalion) at the county level, and a public security company (equivalent to a PLA company) at the township level.

Border Defense Corps 
Prior to the 2018 reform, the People's Armed Police Border Defense Corps guarded China's land and sea borders, as well as its ports and airports. Its main responsibilities were the administration of border and coastal public security, ports and border inspection and surveillance, performing patrols and surveillance activities in areas adjacent to Hong Kong and Macao, as well as patrols and surveillance activities along the demarcation line of the Beibu Gulf and the prevention of and crack-down on illegal and criminal acts in border and coastal areas, such as illegal border crossing, smuggling and drug trafficking.

After the 2018 reform, Port and Seaport detachments of Border Defense Corps have been transferred into the Ministry of Public Security, whereas responsibility of guarding land borders was completely handed over to PLAGF.

China Coast Guard 

The Chinese People's Armed Police Force Coast Guard Corps, also abbreviated as China Coast Guard is the agency for maritime search and rescue and law enforcement in the territorial waters of the People's Republic of China. The China Coast Guard was formerly the maritime branch of the People's Armed Police (PAP) Border Security Force under the Ministry of Public Security until 2013. In March 2013, China announced it would form a unified Coast Guard commanded by the State Oceanic Administration. This renewed Coast Guard has been in operation since July 2013. As of July 1, 2018, the China Coast Guard was transferred from civilian control of the State Council and the State Oceanic Administration, to the People's Armed Police, ultimately placing it under the command of the Central Military Commission (CMC).

According to Joel Wuthnow, the Coast Guard Command within the People's Armed Police possibly is of Corps Leader Grade, led by a Commandant who is usually holding Major General (Rear Admiral) rank.

In June 2018, China Coast Guard was granted maritime rights and law enforcement akin civilian law enforcement agencies in order to carry out contrast of illegal activities, keep peace and order, as well as safeguarding security at sea, when performing duties related to the use of marine resources, protection of marine environment, regulation of fishery, and anti-smuggling.

Special police units 

The People's Armed Police maintains several Special Police Units. They were established in Beijing in early 1980s and in 1983 the first of them was transferred to the People's Armed Police as the People's Armed Police Special Police Group. In 1985 the Group became People's Armed Police Special Police School and, in 2002, it became the People's Armed Police Special Police Academy. In 2002, the Snow Wolf Commando Unit, since 2007 Snow Leopard Commando Unit, was established in Beijing as the second special police unit. According to Joel Wuthnow, the Snow Leopard Commando Unit was moved from the Beijing Contingent to the 2nd Mobile Contingent in 2018.

The special police units are tasked to carry out counter terrorism missions, riot control, anti-hijacking and bomb disposal.

Organisation 
Special Police Units are organized and placed at the Provincial level and at national level.

The national-level Special Police Unit is the People's Armed Police Special Police Academy, reporting to the People's Armed Police Headquarters. The academy has both educational and operational roles. On one hand, it is tasked to provide courses in special reconnaissance and special police operations; on the other hand, it has to carry out counter terrorism missions, riot control, anti-hijacking and bomb disposal. The main operational unit of the People's Armed Police Special Police Academy is the Falcon Unit. In addition, the 1st and 2nd Mobile Contingents maintain a total of 5 Special Operations Detachments.

Each provincial-level Contingent establishes and maintains special police units as part of its own territorial organization. As of 2019, there are three known special police units within the People's Armed Police:
 Falcon Unit: Beijing;
 Snow Leopard Commando Unit: Guangzhou;
 Mountain Eagle Commando Unit: Xinjiang.
For what regards Special Operations detachments of the Mobile Contingents, some of the specialized units may have drawn from the provincial Contingents.

Communications 
Using the national information infrastructure, the PAP has established a preliminary system of three-level integrated information networks, linking general headquarters with the grass-roots squadrons.

Equipment 
In response to the needs of the People's Armed Police, the service provides for the use of many types of weapons. Special Operation Forces of People's Armed Police uses various kind of weapons according to necessity of missions.

 Service sidearm: QSZ-92
 Assault rifle: QBZ-95, QBZ-191
 Submachine gun: QCW-05
 Sniper rifle: QBU-88
Shotgun: Hawk Industries Type 97
 Armoured personnel carrier: WZ-551

In addition, the People's Armed Police makes use of remotely-controlled technologies such as unmanned aerial vehicles, advanced surveillance technology and bomb disposal robots, as well as intelligent unmanned systems.

Ranks and insignia 
Due to its history with the PLA, the PAP has a similar rank structure to the PLA and also obeys its regulations. PAP guards are also recruited at the same time and through the same procedures as PLA soldiers. However, the PAP has its own education and training system separate from the PLA. Like the PLA, the PAP also celebrates Army Day on August 1 of every year, and enjoys the same services as the PLA.

Officers

Non-commissioned officers and enlisted

Historical rank systems

Type 55 PSF-PLA uniform 

Officers

Non-commissioned officers and enlisted

Type 88 PAP 
Officers

Non-commissioned officers and enlisted

See also 

 Gendarmerie
 Republic of China (Taiwan) Military Police

Notes

References

External links 

 

 
Military of the People's Republic of China
China
Government paramilitary forces
Paramilitary organizations based in China